The office of Minister for Foreign Affairs of the Republic of Abkhazia was created on 17 May 1993, during the 1992–1993 war with Georgia. Due to the diplomatic isolation of Abkhazia, which remains widely unrecognised, the role of the foreign minister has been restricted mostly to negotiations over resolving the Georgian-Abkhazian conflict. Empirical data nevertheless show that Abkhazia's Foreign Ministry also enacts (mostly low-level) diplomatic relations, such as the sending of diplomatic notes, with various countries across the world, including Nauru, Vanuatu, Venezuela, Nicaragua, and Syria. It is also active in managing relations with other post-Soviet de facto states such as South Ossetia, Transnistria, and the Lugansk People's Republic.

History

Government of President Ardzinba

On 30 April 1997, former Aidgylara Chairman Sergei Shamba was appointed Foreign Minister instead of Konstantin Ozgan, who had been appointed First Vice Premier, succeeding Sergei Bagapsh, who had been appointed Prime Minister on 29 April.

Shamba remained Foreign Minister until he resigned on 15 June 2004 along with First Vice Premier Astamur Tarba (who eventually stayed on) and Security Service Chairman Givi Agrba following the murder of opposition politician Garri Aiba. Shamba was temporarily replaced by his deputy Gueorgui Otyrba on 18 July, and permanently by Abkhazia's representative in Moscow Igor Akhba on 28 July. On 14 December 2004, following the Tangerine Revolution but while Vladislav Ardzinba was still President, he re-arranged the cabinet. Sergei Shamba was re-appointed Minister for Foreign Affairs and additionally became Vice-Premier.

Government of President Bagapsh

After the election of Sergei Bagapsh as President, Foreign Minister Sergei Shamba was one of the few Ministers to be re-appointed, on 26 March 2005.

Following the re-election of Bagapsh, Shamba was appointed Prime Minister (as outgoing Prime Minister Alexander Ankvab had been elected Vice President), he was succeeded by his deputy Maxim Gvinjia on 26 February.

Government of President Ankvab

After the election of Alexander Ankvab, he appointed diplomat and academic Viacheslav Chirikba as Foreign Minister On 11 October.

Government of President Khajimba

Chirikba was only one of three Cabinet members to be re-appointed in the cabinet of Prime Minister Beslan Butba following the May 2014 Revolution and the subsequent election of Raul Khajimba as President.

Chirikba was again re-appointed under Prime Minister Artur Mikvabia, but on 20 September 2016, after the appointment of Beslan Bartsits as Prime Minister, he released a statement in which he announced his resignation because he was unable to continue in his post under the current circumstances. The Presidential press service responded by claiming that Chirikba had not been re-appointed because he had failed to lead a delegation to Transnistria in early September. Chirikba refuted this in another statement in which he explained that he had not been able to lead the delegation due to an attack of hypertension and claimed that the decision to re-appoint him had already been made at that point and that he had originally submitted his resignation on 31 August after Khajimba had for more than a month refused to meet him to discuss foreign affairs. In a press conference one week later, Khajimba specified that Chirikba had not been active enough as Foreign Minister and that as head of the Ministry, he had to be held responsible for certain financial irregularities that had been uncovered by the Control Chamber. On 4 October Chirikba's successor Daur Kove was appointed. In the intervening period, Deputy Minister Oleg Arshba had served as acting Minister.

List of officeholders

See also

References

Abkhazia, Foreign ministers
Politics of Abkhazia
Members of the Unrepresented Nations and Peoples Organization